ADB-P7AICA is a cannabinoid designer drug that has been found as an ingredient in some synthetic cannabis products, first identified by the DEA in early 2021.

See also 
 5F-CUMYL-P7AICA
 ADBICA
 ADB-PINACA

References 

Cannabinoids
Designer drugs
Pyrrolopyridines
Tert-butyl compounds